The Emerald-class corvettes were a class of six composite screw corvettes built for the Royal Navy in the mid-1870s. The Opal was built by contract under the 1873-74 Programme, and Turquoise, Ruby, Tourmaline and Emerald under the 1874-75 Programme - the first three also by contract, while Emerald was dockyard-built at Pembroke. The final ship (Garnet) was also dockyard-built at Chatham under the 1875-76 Programme.

Design and construction
The construction used iron frames, with wooden cladding around the frames. These were two-decked ships, with the ordnance on the upper deck and accommodation on the main deck below. They were designed to carry the same armament of fourteen 64-pdr guns as the preceding  Amethyst class corvettes from which their design was developed, with two of the guns mounted on rotating slides as bow and stern chasers, and the other twelve guns slide-mounted on the broadsides. 

However, only Opal was so completed, and two of her broadside guns were removed following her first commission. Tourmaline was built with the same number of ports, but with only ten broadside guns vice twelve (plus the two chase guns). The other four vessels were completed with this ordnance (two chasers and ten broadside guns, without ports for a sixth pair of broadside guns) - all these guns being of the 64cwt model. In the early 1880s Tourmaline and Emerald were re-armed with four 6-inch (100-pdr) and eight 5-inch (50-pdr) breach-loader guns.

Ships

Footnotes

Bibliography

 

 
Victorian-era corvettes of the United Kingdom